Lovett Township is one of eleven townships in Jennings County, Indiana, United States. As of the 2010 census, its population was 1,160 and it contained 435 housing units.

Geography
The streams of Polly Branch and Turkey Run run through this township.

Unincorporated towns
 Lovett

Adjacent townships
 Vernon Township (northeast)
 Bigger Township (east)
 Lancaster Township, Jefferson County (east)
 Montgomery Township (south)
 Marion Township (southwest)
 Spencer Township (northwest)

Cemeteries
The township contains four cemeteries: Green, Marsh, Meek and Weston.

Major highways
  Indiana State Road 3
  Indiana State Road 7

References
 
 United States Census Bureau cartographic boundary files

External links
 Indiana Township Association
 United Township Association of Indiana

Townships in Jennings County, Indiana
Townships in Indiana